Malcolm Douglas (14 March 1941 – 23 September 2010) was an Australian wildlife documentary film maker, and crocodile hunter. Douglas started in the 1960s as a professional crocodile hunter and farmer, but later dedicated himself to their preservation.

Biography
In 1964, 23-year-old Malcolm Douglas and his friend David Oldmeadow ditched their jobs as stock and station agents in the Riverina region of New South Wales and set off on a six-month trip around Australia. Six months turned into four years. It was a journey that shaped Douglas' future. As the pair travelled and explored, they filmed their adventures. The film later turned into the documentary Across the Top, which still holds the rating record for a documentary on Australian television. He went on to produce more than 50 documentaries and films for Channel Seven and Channel Nine. Filmed in 2008, his last documentary series, the six-part In The Bush With Malcolm Douglas aired in 2009 on Seven to high ratings on Saturday nights, winning its timeslot in four out of the six weeks.

Douglas was found crushed between his vehicle and a tree; in reports police emphasised that his death was not suspicious but are unsure of the cause of the accident.

Previously Douglas had battled prostate cancer. Douglas was survived by wife, Valerie, and their two adult children.

Crocodile Park
Established in 1983 in Broome, Western Australia, the Malcolm Douglas Crocodile Park holds 30 adult crocodiles that have been captured in the wild after threatening humans.

The park is home to Fatso, a saltwater crocodile who on 12 July 2010 bit a Melbourne man, Michael Newman, who climbed into his enclosure. Newman, who was ejected from a nearby pub called Divers Tavern earlier that night for being overly drunk, scaled the barbed wire fence surrounding Fatso's enclosure and attempted to sit on the crocodile's back. Fatso bit Newman on his right leg, and Newman subsequently escaped the enclosure and returned to Divers Tavern. Mark Phillips, the manager of the pub, noted that Newman had pieces of tree bark hanging off him and chunks of flesh missing from his leg. Newman was given a beer and ordered an ambulance, and was taken to Broome Hospital, where he received dozens of stitches to his leg. Douglas called Newman "fortunate", stating that "Fatso was a bit more sluggish than normal, due to the cooler nights we have been experiencing in Broome. If it had been warmer and Fatso was more alert, we would have been dealing with a fatality." Fatso had arrived at the park in the 1990s after having been removed from the Victoria River near Timber Creek, Northern Territory.

TV programmes
Series:
  
Across the Top
Follow the Sun
Beyond the Kimberley Coast
The Last of a Tribe
Return to the Top
North to Niugini
Return to the Desert
In the Bush with Malcolm Douglas & His Dog Boondie
Life in Broome with Malcolm Douglas
 Survival in the Outback with Malcolm Douglas
 Kayaks in the Kimberley with Malcolm Douglas
 Along the tracks with Malcolm Douglas
 Around Australia with Malcolm Douglas
 Kimberley Adventure with Malcolm Douglas
 Malcolm Douglas Living with Crocodiles
 Travelling True North with Malcolm Douglas
 Catching Crocodiles with Malcolm Douglas
 Journey into Yesterday with Malcolm Douglas
 Bass Strait Adventure with Malcolm Douglas
 The Canning Stock Route with Malcolm Douglas
 The Pearling Coast with Malcolm Douglas
 Kakadu to the Kimberley with Malcolm Douglas
 The Macquarie Marshes with Malcolm Douglas
 Journey to Biggie Island with Malcolm Douglas
 Across the Top Again with Malcolm Douglas
 Crossing the Bar with Malcolm Douglas
 West of the Rock with Malcolm Douglas
 My Country the Kimberley with Malcolm Douglas
 In Search of the Big Barra with Malcolm Douglas
 The Gibb River Road and Beyond with Malcolm Douglas
 Land of the Long Canoes
 Islands of Arnhem Land
 One Summer
 A season of Snow
 The Big River Adventure
 Canoes in the Kimberley with Malcolm Douglas
 Over the range with Malcolm Douglas
 One Wet Season with Malcolm Douglas
 Men of the Desert with Malcolm Douglas
 North from Broome with Malcolm Douglas
 The Wild North West with Malcolm Douglas
 The Coral Coast with Malcolm Douglas
 Broome and Beyond with Malcolm Douglas
 Malcolm Douglas In the Bush

See also
 Bushfood
 Alby Mangels
 Leyland brothers
 Les Hiddins, also known as The Bush Tucker Man

References

External links
 Malcolm Douglas Crocodile Park official website

1941 births
2010 deaths
Australian documentary filmmakers
Road incident deaths in Western Australia
People educated at Wesley College (Victoria)
Television personalities from Melbourne
People from Broome, Western Australia